Creep is a 2004 horror film written and directed by Christopher Smith. The film follows a woman locked in the London Underground overnight. She later finds herself being stalked by a hideously deformed killer living in the sewers below. The film was first shown at the Frankfurt Fantasy Film festival in Germany on 10 August 2004.

Plot
Arthur and George are London sewage workers who discover a tunnel in one of the walls. Arthur starts exploring the tunnel alone, while newbie George stays behind. After a while, George enters and discovers Arthur, injured and in shock. A similarly injured woman jumps out, crying for help, only to be pulled back into the darkness.

A young German woman, Kate, decides to join her friend at a party and heads to Charing Cross Underground station but falls asleep on the platform while waiting for the train. When she awakens, she is alone, and the entire station has been locked up for the night. An empty train arrives, and she boards it; it abruptly stops and the lights go dark. She meets Guy, a coworker who follows her and whose awkward advances she repeatedly rejects. Guy attempts to rape her, only to be stopped by an unseen aggressor who drags him out of the train. Guy briefly reemerges, covered in blood, warning Kate to run.

Kate flees and runs into a homeless Scottish couple living in a storeroom, Jimmy and Mandy, and their dog Ray. Jimmy reluctantly agrees to help her by taking her to the night guard after she pays him. They find Guy, horribly maimed but still alive. Mandy, left alone, is attacked and kidnapped, triggering Jimmy's sorrow-fueled escape into a heroin-induced stupor. Kate manages to communicate with the security guard through intercom, but the man gets killed before being able to call for help. Guy also dies of his wounds. Kate and Jimmy decide to walk through the tunnel to the next station. A train stops near them; Jimmy decides to face the killer to avenge Mandy, but he is slaughtered as well.

Fleeing, Kate falls into the sewer system below, where she finds Arthur's body. She also finds a storage facility with hundreds of boxes, where she is captured by the killer, the titular "creep"—a hideously deformed, mentally ill hermit named Craig, who keeps his victims in semi-submerged, rat-infested cages until they are dead, after which he eats them. Kate is put in one of these cages, along with George. They escape and end up in an abandoned medical facility (looking like an illegal abortion clinic with a series of fetuses lined up along a wall). Where they find an unconscious Mandy strapped to a surgical chair. Thinking she is dead, they move on. Craig appears, puts on a surgical gown, and mimics the gestures of a surgeon in front of a terrorized Mandy before he disembowels her with a bone saw, mimicking an abortion procedure.

Kate and George find the disused railcar where Craig lives. The dog, Ray, is there, along with old pictures of a medical doctor with a deformed child. Craig ambushes them and kills George. In a last, desperate effort, Kate sinks a hook and chain into Craig's throat, then has a running train rip it apart, and Craig bleeds to death. Disheveled, she returns to the initial station, by which point it is morning. She collapses on the platform, and Ray curls onto her lap. Mistaking her for a beggar, a man waiting for the train leaves her a coin, and Kate breaks into hysterical giggles and tears.

Cast
 Franka Potente as Kate
 Vas Blackwood as George
 Ken Campbell as Arthur
 Jeremy Sheffield as Guy
 Paul Rattray as Jimmy
 Kelly Scott as Mandy
 Joe Anderson as male model
 Sean Harris as Craig, the "Creep"
 Morgan Jones as the Night Watchman

Production

The storyline has been compared to the 1972 film Death Line, also set on the London Underground and featuring a cannibalistic killer. Director Smith, who had not seen Death Line, attributes his inspiration to a scene in An American Werewolf in London set in the London Underground.

The Last Tube
'Creep: The Last Tube' is a 2005 online 3D Shockwave horror game made to promote the film and was produced by Jail Dog. Nearly 14 years after the game went down, the website known as The Lost Media Wiki conducted a search for the game.

Beau Chesluk, a developer for the game, was eventually contacted, and after some searching he was able to locate the game files and send them to The Cracks Overhead. The game has since been uploaded to Archive.org.

Critical reception

Creep has received generally mixed reviews from critics. It currently holds a 43% 'rotten' rating on review aggregator website Rotten Tomatoes based on 14 reviews.

Time Out gave the film a negative review, writing, "this London Underground-set slasher squanders a promising premise for trashy shocks, old-school nastiness and a fistful of genre clichés."

All Movie's review was favorable, writing, "this pared-down shocker might be light on plot, but it's packed with creepy frights and psychopathic attitude from its mean main monster."

Matthew Turner View London said "The performances are good, particularly Potent, who avoids scream queen clichés by making her character surprisingly unlikeable - Kate is rude and arrogant in her early scenes and the fact that she's German is, of course, a coincidence."

See also
 List of London Underground-related fiction

References

External links
 
 

2004 films
2004 horror films
2004 thriller films
2000s horror thriller films
2000s mystery horror films
2000s mystery thriller films
2000s serial killer films
2000s monster movies
Abortion in fiction
British horror thriller films
British mystery thriller films
British serial killer films
2000s English-language films
English-language German films
Films about cannibalism
Films directed by Christopher Smith
Films set on the London Underground
Films shot in Cologne
German horror thriller films
German mystery thriller films
German serial killer films
Rape in fiction
2000s British films
2000s German films
British horror films